He Ping may refer to:

He Ping (general) (born 1957), Chinese general
He Ping (director) (born 1957), Chinese director
Ho Ping (He Ping; born 1958), Taiwanese director
Wang Ping (Three Kingdoms) (died 248), also known as He Ping

See also
Heping (disambiguation)